NJOI is an English production duo from Southend, Essex, England, consisting of Nigel Champion and Mark Franklin, (who met at Alleyn Court Prep School) with vocalist/front person Saffron. Champion went to Framlingham College and Franklin to Felsted School but met up again after school in 1987.

Biography
Between 1991 and 1996, they entered the U.S. Billboard Hot Dance Club Play chart five times, all of them hitting the top 10. Two of the songs went to number one: "Mindflux" in 1992 and "The New Anthem" in 1996, which was a new version of their debut single "Anthem," itself a top five dance hit from 1991. In 2006 they returned to the top of the Official UK Dance Chart with a set of remixes of their biggest hit "Anthem".

Discography

Chart singles

See also
Republica
List of number-one dance hits (United States)
List of artists who reached number one on the US Dance chart

References

External links
 Artist profile at discogs.com
 N-Joi Official Web Page

English dance music groups
English house music groups
English electronic music groups
British techno music groups
Hardcore techno music groups
1990 establishments in England
Musical groups established in 1990
Musical groups from Essex
British musical trios